Blake Miller may refer to:

 Blake Miller (American football) (1889–1987), American football player and coach
 Blake Miller (lacrosse) (born 1972), professional lacrosse player